This is a list of members of the New South Wales Legislative Council from 1823 to 1843. All members were appointed.

References

Members of New South Wales parliaments by term
19th-century Australian politicians